Elks' Lodge No. 468 is a Romanesque-style clubhouse located in Kingman, Arizona. The building is listed on the National Register of Historic Places.

Description 
Elks' Lodge No. 468 is located at the Corner of Fourth and Oak Streets in Kingman, Arizona. The building was started in 1903–04 with modifications in 1913. The building is of  Romanesque/Richardsonian style. C. E. Walker was the architect and Norman Hale was the contractor. Mr. Hale was an expert stonemason from the 1890s to the early 1900s. The stone was native and came from Metcalfe Quarry. The first fraternal lodge in Kingman, IOOF and Knights of Pythias also used the lodge. The building was added to the National Register of Historic Places in 1986.

See also
 Elks Building (Globe, Arizona)
 National Register of Historic Places listings in Mohave County, Arizona

References

Cultural infrastructure completed in 1903
Elks buildings
Knights of Pythias buildings
Odd Fellows buildings in Arizona
Clubhouses on the National Register of Historic Places in Arizona
National Register of Historic Places in Kingman, Arizona
1903 establishments in Arizona Territory
Richardsonian Romanesque architecture in the United States
Romanesque Revival architecture in Arizona